The 19th Moscow International Film Festival was held from 17 to 28 July 1995. The Golden St. George was not awarded.

Jury
 Richard Gere (United States – President of the Jury)
 Friedrich Gorenstein (Germany)
 Aurelio De Laurentiis (Italy)
 Otar Iosseliani (France)
 László Kovács (United States)
 Jiří Menzel (Czech Republic)
 David Robinson (Great Britain)
 Lidiya Fedoseyeva-Shukshina (Russia)
 Jerome Hellman (United States)
 Conrad Hall (United States)

Films in competition
The following films were selected for the main competition:

Awards
 Golden St. George: Not awarded
 Silver St. George for Directing:
 Régis Wargnier for A French Woman
 Milan Šteindler for Thanks for Every New Morning
 Special Silver St. George: Director of Photography Lajos Koltai for Mario and the Magician
 Silver St. George:
 Best Actor: Gabriel Barylli for A French Woman
 Best Actress: Emmanuelle Béart for A French Woman
 Prix of Ecumenical Jury: The Englishman Who Went Up a Hill But Came Down a Mountain by Christopher Monger
 Honorable Diplomas:
 For the contribution to cinema: Sergei Bondarchuk
 Tonino Guerra, screenwriter
 Beata Tyszkiewicz, actress

References

External links
Moscow International Film Festival: 1995 at Internet Movie Database

1995
1995 film festivals
1995 in Moscow
Moscow
Moscow
July 1995 events in Russia